Concentration Camps in Nazi Germany: The New Histories is a collection of essays on aspects of the Nazi concentration camps, edited by Jane Caplan and Nikolaus Wachsmann. It was published by Routledge in 2009.

References

2009 non-fiction books
Routledge books
History books about Nazi concentration camps